Mount Zion Cemetery is a large Jewish cemetery located in Maspeth, Queens, New York City. The first burial was in 1893, and as of 2015, more than 210,000 individuals had been buried there. It is noted for its memorial to those who died in the Triangle Shirtwaist Factory fire.

Its grounds cover approximately 78 acres, and are divided into hundreds of plots, or gates, by landsmanshaften, synagogues, or families.

Notable burials
 Herman M. Albert (1901–1947), lawyer, New York State Assemblyman
 Birdie Amsterdam (1901–1996), lawyer, judge, and New York State Supreme Court justice
 William Cohen (? –1922), U.S. Army sergeant killed by troops of Pancho Villa on U.S. soil in the Glenn Springs raid
 Bernard Drachman (1861–1945), rabbi
 Morris Michael Edelstein (1888–1941), US Congressman
 Isidore Einstein (1880–1938), federal agent in the Bureau of Prohibition
 Berta Gersten (1894–1972), actress
 Marvin Hamlisch (1944–2012), composer and conductor
 Abraham Harawitz (1879–1935), lawyer, New York S tate Assemblyman, Municipal Court Justice
 Lorenz Hart (1895–1943), lyricist
 Naftali Herz Imber (1856–1909), poet, lyricist, and composer of Hatikva, the Israeli national anthem. Disinterred and reburied in Israel in 1953.
 Mathilde Krim (1926–2018), medical researcher
 Irving L. Levey (1898–1970), New York State Supreme Court justice
 Edna Luby (1884–1928), actress and comedian
 Theresa Moers (1893–1924), killed by the boxer Kid McCoy
 Herman Weiss (about 1869–1934), New York assemblyman
 Nathanael West (1903–1940), author and screenwriter
 Eva Zeisel (1906–2011), industrial designer

References

External links
 
 

Jewish cemeteries in New York City
Cemeteries in Queens, New York
Maspeth, Queens
1893 establishments in New York (state)